Episcomitra cornicula is a species of sea snail, a marine gastropod mollusk, in the family Mitridae, the miters or miter snails.

Description
THe length of the shell varies between 11 mm and 40 mm.

Distribution
This species occurs in the Mediterranean Sea, in the Atlantic Ocean and in tropical seas.

References

 Menke, C.T. (1829) Verzeichniss der Ansehnlichen Conchylien-Sammlung des Freiherrn von den Malsburg. Heinrich Gelpte, Pyrmont, vi + 123 pp

External links
 Linnaeus, C. (1758). Systema Naturae per regna tria naturae, secundum classes, ordines, genera, species, cum characteribus, differentiis, synonymis, locis. Editio decima, reformata [10th revised edition, vol. 1: 824 pp. Laurentius Salvius: Holmiae]
 Gmelin J.F. (1791). Vermes. In: Gmelin J.F. (Ed.) Caroli a Linnaei Systema Naturae per Regna Tria Naturae, Ed. 13. Tome 1(6). G.E. Beer, Lipsiae [Leipzig. pp. 3021-3910]
 Bosc, L. A. G. (1801). Histoire naturelle des coquilles, contenant leur description, les moeurs des animaux qui les habitent et leurs usages. Deterville, Paris. vol. 1, 343 p.; vol. 2, 330 p.; vol. 3, 292 p.; vol. 4, 280 p.; vol. 5, 255 p., 1 table, 44 plates.
 Link D.H.F. (1807-1808). Beschreibung der Naturalien-Sammlung der Universität zu Rostock. Rostock: Adlers Erben
 Lamarck [J.B.M.de. (1811). Suite de la détermination des espèces de Mollusques testacés. Mitre (Mitra.). Annales du Muséum National d'Histoire Naturelle. 17: 195-222.]
  Lamarck, [J.-B. M. de. (1822). Histoire naturelle des animaux sans vertèbres. Tome septième. Paris: published by the Author, 711 pp.]
 Risso, A. (1826-1827). Histoire naturelle des principales productions de l'Europe Méridionale et particulièrement de celles des environs de Nice et des Alpes Maritimes. Paris, Levrault:. . 3(XVI): 1-480, 14 pls.
 Philippi, R. A. (1836). Enumeratio molluscorum Siciliae cum viventium tum in tellure tertiaria fossilium, quae in itinere suo observavit. Vol. 1. I-XIV, 1-303, Tab. XIII-XXVIII. Schropp, Berlin
 Forbes E. (1844). Report on the Mollusca and Radiata of the Aegean sea, and on their distribution, considered as bearing on geology. Reports of the British Association for the Advancement of Science for 1843. 130-193
 Reeve L.A. (1844-1845). Monograph of the genus Mitra. In: Conchologia Iconica, vol. 2, pl. 1-39 and unpaginated text. L. Reeve & Co., London
 Adams A. (1853 ["1851"). Description of fifty-two new species of the genus Mitra, from the Cumingian collection. Proceedings of the Zoological Society of London. 19: 132-141]
 Brusina S. (1866). Contribuzione pella fauna dei molluschi dalmati. Verhandlungen der Kaiserlich-königlichen Zoologisch-botanisch Gesellschaft in Wien 16: 1-134,
 Weinkauff H. C. (1867-1868). Die Conchylien des Mittelmeeres, ihre geographische und geologisches Verbreitung. T. Fischer, Cassel 
 Locard A. (1886). Prodrome de malacologie française. Catalogue général des mollusques vivants de France. Mollusque marins. Lyon, H. Georg & Paris, Baillière : pp. X + 778
 Pallary, P. (1920). Exploration scientifique du Maroc organisée par la Société de Géographie de Paris et continuée par la Société des Sciences Naturelles du Maroc. Deuxième fascicule. Malacologie. i>Larose, Rabat et Paris pp. 108. 1(1): map
 Fedosov A., Puillandre N., Herrmann M., Kantor Yu., Oliverio M., Dgebuadze P., Modica M.V. & Bouchet P. (2018). The collapse of Mitra: molecular systematics and morphology of the Mitridae (Gastropoda: Neogastropoda). Zoological Journal of the Linnean Society. 183(2): 253-337

cornicula
Gastropods described in 1758
Taxa named by Carl Linnaeus